Adriënne Broeckman-Klinkhamer (1876–1976) was a Dutch painter, illustrator, and textile artist.

Biography
Broeckman-Klinkhamer née Klinkhamer was born on 4 December 1876 in Amsterdam, the seventh of ten children. She attended School voor Kunstnijverheid (Haarlem) (School for Arts and Crafts (Haarlem)) and Akademie van beeldende kunsten (Den Haag) (Royal Academy of Art, The Hague) Around 1908 she married fellow artist Anne Marinus Broeckman (1874-1946) with whom she had two children, one of whom, Elga Eymer, went on to become an artist. The couple settled in Laren in North Holland.

In 1915 Broeckman-Klinkhamer became one of the few women members of the Gooi artists association Club De Tien. Her work was included in the 1939 exhibition and sale Onze Kunst van Heden (Our Art of Today) at the Rijksmuseum in Amsterdam.

Broeckman-Klinkhamer died on 12 April 1976 in Velsen.

References

External links
images of Broeckman-Klinkhamer's work on De Digitale Bibliotheek voor de Nederlandse Letteren (DBNL)

1876 births
1976 deaths
Painters from Amsterdam
19th-century Dutch women artists
20th-century Dutch women artists
19th-century women textile artists
19th-century textile artists
20th-century women textile artists
20th-century textile artists
Dutch women painters